Carteret County is located in the U.S. state of North Carolina. As of the 2020 census, the population was 67,686. Its county seat is Beaufort. The county was created in 1722 as Carteret Precinct and gained county status in 1739. It was named for Sir George Carteret, one of the 17th century English Lords Proprietor, or for his descendant and heir John Carteret, 2nd Earl Granville.

Carteret County comprises the Morehead City, NC Micropolitan Statistical Area, which is also included in the New Bern-Morehead City, NC Combined Statistical Area. Most of the county is part of the Crystal Coast.

History
The first male of English parents born in the current area of North Carolina was John Fulford. He was born in 1629 in what is now Carteret County. He settled in this area and died in 1729. An article dated Sept. 18, 1893, in The New Bern Daily Journal, identified Fulford's grave in a cemetery outside the county seat of Beaufort, in an area called the Straits. It was described as "bricked up with English brick." In 1971 a survey by the Carteret County Historical Society found such a grave in the Fulford Cemetery off Piper Lane in Gloucester.  The unmarked, bricked-up grave matching this description survives today.

One of the more prominent families from Carteret County was the Dennis family. William Dennis Sr. (b.1720 - d.1800) was an extremely colorful landowner, Revolutionary War officer, and defender of the county. In 1747, he assisted with the successful defense of the county during the War of Jenkins' Ear (fighting against Spanish pirates). During the Revolutionary War he served as a 2nd Major in the Carteret County Regiment of the North Carolina militia. In 1782, he fought alongside Lieutenant Colonel John Easton to drive the British from Carteret County.  Dennis once owned the Hammock House, which became well known as the house owned by the pirate Blackbeard. His son, William Dennis Junior was a Captain in the 8th North Carolina Regiment (1777-1778), was present at Valley Forge and also fought in the Carteret County Regiment (1781-1782). In the 1790 US Census, Dennis was one of the largest land owners in the county. Branches of the Dennis family include the Bells, Watsons and Pelletiers, many of whom continued to live in the area for many years. In a typical pattern of following the availability of new lands in the Deep South, some branches of this family later migrated to Mississippi and Texas in the 19th century.

Geography

It is the third-largest county in North Carolina by total area.

National protected areas/sites
 Cape Lookout Lighthouse
 Cape Lookout National Seashore
 Cedar Island National Wildlife Refuge
 Croatan National Forest (part)

State and local protected areas 
 Croatan Game Land (part)
 Fort Macon State Park
 Rachel Carson Reserve
 Theodore Roosevelt State Natural Area
Outstanding water sources and protected areas:
 Back Bay Mechanical Harvesting of Oysters Prohibited Area
 Back Sound Mechanical Harvesting of Oysters Prohibited Area
 Back Sound Outstanding Resource Water
 Bardens Inlet Crab Spawning Sanctuary
 Bear Island Area Outstanding Resource Water (part)
 Bogue Sound Mechanical Harvesting of Oysters Prohibited Area
 Bogue Sound Outstanding Resource Water
 Core Sound, Neuse River Basin Outstanding Resource Water
 Core Sound, White Oak River Basin Outstanding Resource Water
 Drum Inlet Crab Spawning Sanctuary
 Neuse-Southeast Pamlico Sound Area Outstanding Resource Water (part)
 Newport River Mechanical Harvesting of Oysters Prohibited Area
 North Bay Mechanical Harvesting of Oysters Prohibited Area
 North River Mechanical Harvesting of Oysters Prohibited Area
 Ocracoke Inlet Crab Spawning Sanctuary (part)
 Rachel Carson Estuarine Reserve Dedicated Nature Preserve
 The Straits Mechanical Harvesting of Oysters Prohibited Area
 White Oak River Mechanical Harvesting of Oysters Prohibited Area (part)

Major water bodies 
 Adams Creek
 Atlantic Ocean
 Back Sound
 Barden Inlet
 Barry Bay
 Bogue Sound
 Calico Bay
 Cedar Island Bay
 Core Sound
 Drum Inlet
 Harlowe Creek
 Intracoastal Waterway
 Jarrett Bay
 Long Bay
 Nelson Bay
 Newport River
 Neuse River
 North River
 Ocracoke Inlet
 Onslow Bay
 Pamlico Sound
 Raleigh Bay
 South River
 Thorofare Bay
 Turnagain Bay
 West Bay
 West Thorofare Bay
 White Oak River

Adjacent counties
 Pamlico County - north
 Craven County - north
 Jones County - north
 Onslow County - west
 Hyde County - northeast

Major highways
  (Concurrency with US 70)

Major infrastructure 
 Amtrak Thruway (Morehead City)
 Cedar Island - Ocracoke Ferry (To Hyde County)
 Michael J. Smith Field
 Local ferries to the uninhabited Cape Lookout National Seashore
 Port of Morehead City

Demographics

2020 census

As of the 2020 United States census, there were 67,686 people, 28,962 households, and 18,292 families residing in the county.

2000 census
As of the census of 2000, there were 59,383 people, 25,204 households, and 17,365 families residing in the county.  The population density was 114 people per square mile (44/km2).  There were 40,947 housing units at an average density of 79 per square mile (30/km2).  The racial makeup of the county was 90.28% White, 6.99% Black or African American, 0.54% Asian, 0.43% Native American, 0.06% Pacific Islander, 0.60% from other races, and 1.09% from two or more races.  1.74% of the population were Hispanic or Latino of any race.

There were 25,204 households, out of which 26.50% had children under the age of 18 living with them, 56.00% were married couples living together, 9.60% had a female householder with no husband present, and 31.10% were non-families. 26.10% of all households were made up of individuals, and 10.10% had someone living alone who was 65 years of age or older.  The average household size was 2.31 and the average family size was 2.76.

In the county, the population was spread out, with 20.70% under the age of 18, 6.40% from 18 to 24, 27.20% from 25 to 44, 28.40% from 45 to 64, and 17.20% who were 65 years of age or older.  The median age was 42 years. For every 100 females there were 96 males.  For every 100 females age 18 and over, there were 94 males.

The median income for a household in Carteret County in 2009 was $49,711, and the median income for a family was $45,499. Males had a median income of $31,365 versus $22,126 for females. The per capita income for the county was $21,260.  About 8.00% of families and 10.70% of the population were below the poverty line, including 15.40% of those under age 18 and 9.40% of those age 65 or over.

Government and politics
Carteret County is a member of the regional Eastern Carolina Council of Governments. It includes 16 of North Carolina's townships.

Carteret County operates under the Council-Manager form of Government in North Carolina. The County Manager is Tommy Burns.

A voting machine malfunction in the county resulted in the loss of 4,438 ballots cast during early voting for the November 2, 2004 general election.  Since the number of lost ballots exceeded the lead held (by Steve Troxler over Britt Cobb) in the statewide race for agriculture commissioner, the State Board of Elections decided to hold a special election on January 11, 2005, open only to the 18,500 voters in the county who either failed to vote or whose votes were lost. Both candidates filed legal challenges contesting the format of the new election. On February 4, 2005, Cobb conceded the race.

Education

Primary and secondary education
The county is served by the Carteret County Public Schools. Carteret County Public Schools has 16 schools ranging from pre-kindergarten to twelfth grade. Those 16 schools are separated into three high schools, four middle schools, and nine elementary schools.

In addition the county is home to a public charter school and three private schools:
 Tiller School is a grade K-5 public charter school in Beaufort, NC.
 Saint Egbert School is a grade K-5 Catholic school in Morehead City, NC.
 Grace Christian School is a grade K-8 school in Newport, NC.
 Gramercy Christian School is a grade K-12 school in Newport, NC.

Higher learning
 Carteret Community College (CCC)
 UNC-Chapel Hill Institute of Marine Sciences (UNC-IMS)
 NCSU Center for Marine Sciences and Technology (CMAST)
 Duke University Marine Laboratory

Media 

The Carteret County News-Times is a community newspaper based in Morehead City that serves Carteret County and nearby areas. Its predecessors were The Beaufort News, a newspaper founded in 1912, and the Twin City Daily Times, a newspaper founded in 1936. The Phillips family purchased and merged the two newspapers together to form Carteret County News-Times. The Carteret County News-Timess earliest printing was on May 18, 1948. Beginning in 1981, the newspaper has published three editions a week: Wednesday, Friday, and Sunday. According to the 2010 book North Carolina's Central Coast and New Bern, the newspaper is "a good source of information for vacationers who want to know the schedules of tours, festivals, kids' programs, seminars, exhibits and events of all types within the county and the surrounding area".

Military
Marine Corps Auxiliary Landing Field Bogue is located in the western section of Carteret County along Bogue Sound.  It comprises an  landing field located on Bogue Sound that serves as the Marine Corps’ only East Coast site for Field Carrier Landing Practice (FCLP).

Marine Corps Outlying Field Atlantic is a training field in Atlantic. The USMC manages the Navy's Dumpling Creek Transmission Station in Merrimon. BT-11 Piney Island in Davis and Cat Island in Bogue Sound are former Marine Corps bombing ranges.

The Marine Corps also has a facility in Beaufort, at the southern tip of Radio Island (between the NC State Port in Morehead City, and the marine science laboratories on Pivers Island in Beaufort). It is military property, but is only manned during military port operations.

The US Navy has a Port Control Office and the US Army has a Reserve Center, both in the eastern part of Morehead City. The NC National Guard has an Armory in Morehead City.

The US Coast Guard operates a Sector Office at Fort Macon, as well as a USCG Station at Emerald Isle and Morehead City.

Communities

Towns

 Atlantic Beach
 Beaufort (county seat)
 Bogue
 Cape Carteret
 Cedar Point
 Emerald Isle
 Indian Beach
 Morehead City (largest town)
 Newport
 Peletier
 Pine Knoll Shores

Townships
 Atlantic
 Beaufort
 Cedar Island
 Davis
 Harkers Island
 Harlowe
 Marshallburg
 Merrimon
 Morehead
 Newport
 Portsmouth
 Sea Level
 Smyrna
 Stacy
 Straits
 White Oak

Census-designated places
 Atlantic
 Brandywine Bay
 Broad Creek
 Davis
 Gloucester
 Harkers Island
 Marshallberg

Unincorporated communities

 Bettie
 Cedar Island
 Gales Creek
 Harlowe
 Lola
 Merrimon
 Mill Creek
 North River
 Ocean
 Otway
 Salter Path
 Sea Gate
 Sea Level
 Stacy
 Stella
 Straits
 Smyrna
 Wildwood
 Williston
 Wiregrass

See also
 List of counties in North Carolina
 National Register of Historic Places listings in Carteret County, North Carolina
 List of townships in North Carolina
 North Carolina Aquarium at Pine Knoll Shores
 North Carolina Ferry System
 North Carolina State Parks
 National Park Service
 List of future Interstate Highways

References

External links

 
 
 Carteret County Chamber of Commerce

 
1739 establishments in North Carolina
Populated places established in 1739